Robert Gustavus Beebe (born September 23, 1992) is an American soccer player.

Career
Beebe played four years of college soccer at the University of South Carolina between 2011 and 2014, including a red-shirted year in his Freshman year.

In 2016, Beebe joined National Premier League side Myrtle Beach Mutiny, before later joining up again with Charleston Battery.

Beebe also played with USL PDL side SC United Bantams during his time at college.

In 2015, Beebe joined United Soccer League side Charleston Battery, but spent the majority of the season on loan with PDL side SC United Bantams.

After a trial in 2017, Beebe signed with Swedish football Division 2 Södra side Södertälje FK, where he made ten appearances.

Beebe once again returned to sign with Charleston Battery ahead of their 2018 season.

References

1992 births
Living people
American soccer players
Association football goalkeepers
Charleston Battery players
Myrtle Beach Mutiny players
People from Summerville, South Carolina
SC United Bantams players
Soccer players from South Carolina
Södertälje FK players
South Carolina Gamecocks men's soccer players
USL Championship players
USL League Two players
American expatriate sportspeople in Sweden
Expatriate footballers in Sweden
American expatriate soccer players